Chicken in the Rough, also known as Beverly's Chicken in the Rough, is a fried chicken restaurant chain and former franchise. It was one of the earliest restaurant chain franchises in the United States. Chicken in the Rough was founded by Beverly and Rubye Osborne in 1936 in Oklahoma City,  and the restaurant's specialty, half a fried chicken dish, was also created in 1936. The dish itself was also referred to as "Chicken in the Rough", and consisted of half a fried chicken, shoestring potatoes and a biscuit with honey. Three restaurants presently serve the dish today, located in Oklahoma City,  Port Huron, Michigan and Canadian neighbor Sarnia, Ontario. The chain's logo was an image of a rooster smoking a cigar and carrying a golf club. The chain also used a logo of "Chicken's Caddie", which depicted a chick acting as a golf caddie, stating "I'll gladly be fried for Chicken in the Rough".

History
The restaurant's name was devised on a cancelled 1936 road trip to California, in which Beverly spilled a picnic basket of chicken after Rubye hit a bump in the road while driving on the Oklahoma prairie. Rubye remarked something to the effect of "This is really chicken in the rough". After this occurred, they turned around and headed back to Oklahoma City. Another notion is that the name was devised on a family picnic "where silverware had been forgotten", and that the consumption of the chicken without silverware constituted eating it "in the rough", using one's hands. However, the official website of the chain states that the former occurred.

Beverly's Pancake Corner in Oklahoma City, Oklahoma, now called Beverly's Pancake House, has been described as the "home base" of Chicken in the Rough. Three additional restaurant locations presently serve the dish. The half-chicken dish continued to be served at Beverly's Pancake House, where it's prepared according to its original recipe. The first standalone Chicken in the Rough restaurant was opened on U.S. Route 66 at 2429 North Lincoln in 1936, and was initially a small drive-in restaurant with nine stools and four booths. The restaurant was significantly expanded to seat 1,100 people, and became a place that was visited by travelers, film stars and state executives. Celebrities who were friends with the Osbornes and patrons of Beverly's Pancake Corner restaurants include Bob Hope and Gene Autry. Beverly's Pancake House has a framed black-and-white photo on a wall showing Hope with a birthday cake that the restaurant made him one year. In 1961, the building was demolished, and the state capitol complex was then constructed there.

Expansion
Chicken in the Rough was the first nationally franchised restaurant chain in the United States. In 1937, the chain had locations on Route 66 in the U.S. states of Arizona, Oklahoma, Missouri and Illinois. In 1949, an extraordinary grill was designed that simultaneously fried and steamed chicken, after which time franchising began.  During its heyday, the chain had seven locations in Oklahoma City and nearly 300 franchise locations, including franchises in South Africa and Hawaii. In the 1960s, after the franchise was sold to an investor group, 68 franchises remained. In 1974 Osborne's partner, Randy Shaw, purchased the restaurant chain.

Today
Three restaurants continue to serve the dish: two restaurants in Sarnia, Ontario, Canada and one in Port Huron, Michigan. The dish is presently prepared with a unique breading and preparation method, and cooked in a deep fryer. Patrons of Beverly's Pancake Corner from the times of their youth continue to eat at the restaurant, which has included some who remember the first day it opened. When the Beverly's Pancake Corner location at Northwest Expressway and Pennsylvania in Oklahoma City, where it existed since 1956, was razed in 2008, people took pieces of concrete and bricks from the building as mementos.

See also
 List of chicken restaurants
 List of restaurant chains in the United States

References

Further reading

External links

 

Fast-food chains of the United States
1936 establishments in Oklahoma
Fast-food poultry restaurants
Chicken chains of the United States
American companies established in 1936